Neoneura carnatica is a species of damselfly in the family Protoneuridae. It is endemic to Cuba.  Its natural habitats are subtropical or tropical moist lowland forests and rivers. It is threatened by habitat loss.

References

Fauna of Cuba
Protoneuridae
Insects described in 1886
Taxonomy articles created by Polbot
Endemic fauna of Cuba